Margery Baxter (fl. 1429) was an outspoken and unorthodox Lollard from Martham, England. She was brought to trial twice and flogged at church.

Life
Baxter's early life is unknown. She lived in Martham in Norfolk where her husband William Baxter was a wright. Her husband was convicted as a heretic before she came to trial.

Background
The Lollards were a fourteenth and fifteenth century group of people who followed the teachings of John Wycliffe, an English scholar and theologian who saw corruption in the Catholic Church, which at the time held great power, and sought to bring about reforms. A few of Wycliffe and his followers' main points of interest were translating the Bible into English for the common man to read, cleansing religion of corruption and excessive wealth, and bringing all Christians in to more direct contact with God. Ultimately, the Lollards laid the groundwork for the future of Protestantism in England which would flourish in the following centuries. But at the time, all of these ideas were extremely controversial and politically dangerous, because the monarchy and the powerful Catholic church were closely knit together.

Teachings

Influenced by the revolutionary work of John Wycliffe and by her own personal radical thoughts, Baxter taught a variety of even more controversial Lollard doctrines. She was very critical of regimented church life and spoke out against multiple church practices from Sunday worship traditions to infant baptism to the image of the crucifix.  As were many Lollards, Baxter was tried for heresy in October 1428 and in 1429 as part of the Norwich Heresy Trials (1428-1431).

Accusations and Trial

Johanna Clifland testified against her, claiming that Baxter had expressed a variety of unorthodox sentiments, speaking out against the traditions of sanctioned marriage, fasting for religious days, and the swearing of religious oaths. Echoing foundational Lollard beliefs, Baxter also opposed the wealth of Catholic clergymen and the practice of confession to church officials.

Baxter was an admirer of her fellow Lollard Hawise Mone. She and Baxter were followers of the heretic priest William White who had been burnt at the stake in 1428 with fellow heretics Hugh Pye of Loddon and John (or William) Waddon.

Six months after Johanna Clifland made her accusations, Margery Baxter confessed in October, 1428, and she was sentenced to four Sunday floggings at her parish church. two at the local market place and then two recants at the cathedral. She had admitted that she had smuggled and hidden Whites teachings at her home and that she believed six heresies:
 only people who keep God's commandments are Christian 
 confessions to God are not required (one can rely on God's mercy) 
 pilgrimages are generally not required; 
 killing of any type including capital punishment are wrong 
 any good person is a priest 
 oaths are only required in a court.

She was brought to trial again in April 1429 and although the charges were serious she believed she would escape death because she was pregnant. This was not certain but she was not sentenced to death and this may be because she implicated another lollard, John Pyry from Martham.

References

Lollards
Year of death missing
Year of birth missing
15th-century English women
15th-century English people
People from Martham